{{DISPLAYTITLE:C21H29N}}
The molecular formula C21H29N (molar mass: 295.46 g/mol, exact mass: 295.2300 u) may refer to:

 Diisopromine, a synthetic spasmolytic
 Methade, a chemical intermediate in opioid synthesis

Molecular formulas